Vivo X90 is a series of Android-based smartphones developed and manufactured by Vivo. They were announced on November 22, 2022.

References 

Android (operating system) devices
Vivo smartphones
Mobile phones introduced in 2022